Malla is a village in Abbottabad District of Khyber Pakhtunkhwa province of Pakistan. It is located at  an altitude of 875 metres (2871 feet). Malla is a hilly area in the northern part of Pakistan.

Climate 

Malla has a humid subtropical climate (Cwa)

References

Populated places in Abbottabad District